Samuel Owen may refer to:

 Samuel Owen (engineer) (1774–1854), British-Swedish engineer
 Samuel Owen (artist) (1769–1857), English marine painter
 Satō (佐藤 Satou, born Samuel T. Owen), fictional Japanese terrorist